Renato Rocha may refer to:

 Renato Rocha (guitarist) (born 1975), Brazilian singer-songwriter, guitarist and keyboardist with Detonautas Roque Clube
 Renato Rocha (bassist) (1961–2015), Brazilian musician and songwriter with Legião Urbana